Namık Kemal High School is a public funded Anatolian high school in İzmir, Turkey. It was founded in 1853 as a rüştiye and became a lise in 1922. Located at the north of Kültürpark, it is a historic high school.

History 

Firstly, it was decided to build the structure in 1909 by increase of number of the students of the Rum Evanjelik Mektebi and its construction plot was purchased with gathering the funds. Then, the building which is known as Namık Kemal High School was started building. However, its construction was stopped by Balkan Wars and the First World War. Afterwards, construction was started again in 1919–1922 while Greek government was in the saddle. Although retouch of building was finished 1922 summer, the school could not move to the new building because of exchange between Greece-Turkey and Küçük Asya Felaketi. After the proclamation of Turkey Republic, the building devolved on Turks. For a while, it was used as a hospital and quarter of English during the war. The building was also used as İzmir Kız High School at 1924–25 and used as a guesthouse by Kültürpark. In 1939, it was used as İzmir İkinci Erkek High School after that it is renamed as İnönü High School. The building was renamed again as Namık Kemal High School in 1952–53. Nowadays, it is called as Namık Kemal Anatolia High School.

Context 
Namık Kemal High School is located in Konak İzmir (north of Kültürpark). Although it was used for different purposes in the past, it is used educational recently. One approach of the building is from a thoroughfare, the other one is from a street alley.

Formal qualities 
The building has Neo-Greek and Neo-Classic style. It has E-shaped plan. There is one main block and three perpendicular blocks. It has pitch roof and triangular pediments are emphasized on the facade.

Spatial experience 
The repetition of plasters between rectangular windows make pattern on the facade. The entrance is defined by high platform and two Ionic column. Inside, there are two Doric columns are following the two Ionic columns. Timber is used on the handrail. There are floral motives on the balustrades. The building has many marble ornamentation and coffer ceiling. It has 2 terraces facing the garden.

Structure and material qualities 
Doric columns and marble pillars are load bearing members of the building. Timber, marble, stone and iron used as materials. Using marble in the ornamentation make the building more fancy.

References 

Educational institutions established in 1922
1922 establishments in the Ottoman Empire
High schools in İzmir
Konak District